Keith G. Birlem (May 4, 1915 – May 7, 1943) was an American football end in the National Football League for the Washington Redskins and Chicago Cardinals.

Early life
Birlem was born San Jose, California and attended San Mateo High School.

Football career
Birlem attended and played college football at San José State University, where he played quarterback. He was inducted into their Sports Hall of Fame.

Military career
Birlem, who reached the rank of major during World War II, was killed trying to land a combat-damaged B-17 bomber at RAF Polebrook in England in 1943. His bomber hit another plane and cut the tail off of it. Both crashed near the perimeter of RAF Polebrook and all 20 inside both planes died.

References

External links

Football and America: WW II Honor Roll
303rd BG (H) Combat Mission No. 33-4 May 1943
Los Angeles Times Obituary
World War II Memorial, San Rafael

1915 births
1943 deaths
Players of American football from San Jose, California
American football tight ends
San Jose State Spartans football players
Chicago Cardinals players
Washington Redskins players
United States Army Air Forces personnel killed in World War II
United States Army Air Forces officers
Aviators killed in aviation accidents or incidents in England
Victims of aviation accidents or incidents in 1943
United States Army Air Forces bomber pilots of World War II